Kusehlar-e Sofla (also Romanized as Kūsehlar-e Soflá; also known as Kūsālār-e Soflá and Kūsehlar) is a village in Zarrineh Rud Rural District, in the Central District of Miandoab County, West Azerbaijan Province, Iran. At the 2006 census, its population was 501, in 125 families.

References 

Populated places in Miandoab County